Artem Eduardovych Kozlov (born 10 February 1997) is a Ukrainian professional footballer who plays as a left-back for Ukrainian club Chaika Petropavlivska Borshchahivka.

Career
Kozlov is a product of Shakhtar Donetsk Youth School System in his native Donetsk. 

He signed contract with Olimpik Donetsk in summer 2014 and played in the Ukrainian Premier League Reserves. In July 2017 he went on loan and made his debut for Helios Kharkiv in the Ukrainian First League in a match against Balkany Zorya on 15 July 2017.

On 21 November 2018, it was announced that he is banned from competitions for participating in fixed games.

References

External links
 
 

1997 births
Living people
Footballers from Donetsk
Ukrainian footballers
Association football defenders
FC Olimpik Donetsk players
FC Helios Kharkiv players
PFC Sumy players
FC Kramatorsk players
SC Chaika Petropavlivska Borshchahivka players
Ukrainian Premier League players
Ukrainian First League players